1,2-Bis(diisopropylphosphino)ethane (dippe) is a commonly used bidentate ligand in coordination chemistry. This compound is similar to the ligand 1,2-bis(diphenylphosphino)ethane (dppe),  with the substitution of isopropyl groups for phenyl groups.

Diphosphines
Isopropyl compounds